Austria competed at the 2019 World Aquatics Championships in Gwangju, South Korea from 12 to 28 July.

Artistic swimming

Austria's artistic swimming team consisted of 3 athletes (3 female).

Women

 Legend: (R) = Reserve Athlete

Open water swimming

Austria qualified one male open water swimmer.

Swimming

Austria has entered seven swimmers.

Men

Women

References

World Aquatics Championships
2019
Nations at the 2019 World Aquatics Championships